"Wall of Glass" is the debut solo single by English singer and songwriter Liam Gallagher. Gallagher co-wrote the song with Andrew Wyatt and producer Greg Kurstin. The song was released as the lead single for Gallagher's debut solo studio album, As You Were (2017). It was initially set for release on 2 June but was instead released a day earlier.

"Wall of Glass" reached number 60 on the UK Singles Chart on 2 June, just one day after its release. It peaked at number 21 after Gallagher's performance at One Love Manchester. It is his best-selling single as a solo artist, eventually being certified Platinum by the BPI, and remained his highest-charting single in the UK until 2022's "Everything's Electric" reached number 18.

Music video
In the song's disorienting video, Gallagher is seen in a hall of mirrors. He later stares into a mirror, but only his reflection sings back. Elsewhere, the camera flips upside down as Gallagher glides down a mysterious hallway, seated on a chair.

The music video was released on 31 May 2017, and is directed by François Rousselet and produced by Riff Raff Film.

Charts

Certifications

References

External links
 

2017 songs
2017 debut singles
Liam Gallagher songs
Songs written by Liam Gallagher
Songs written by Greg Kurstin
Songs written by Andrew Wyatt
Song recordings produced by Greg Kurstin
Warner Records singles
Songs written by Michael Tighe